Tomasi Kanailagi is a Fijian Methodist minister and political leader.  The former President of the Methodist Church of Fiji and Rotuma, Fiji's largest Christian denomination, served in the Senate from 2001 to 2006 as a nominee of the Prime Minister, Laisenia Qarase.  (Under the now-defunct 1997 Constitution, 9 of the 32 Senate seats were filled by nominees of the Prime Minister; a further 8 were chosen by the Leader of the Opposition, 14 by the Great Council of Chiefs, and one by the Council of Rotuma).

As of January 2007, Kanailagi was Chairperson of the Fiji Council of Churches.

Rev Kanailagi attended Lelean Memorial School before embarking on his Theological Studies at Davuilevu.

Living people
I-Taukei Fijian Methodist ministers
I-Taukei Fijian members of the Senate (Fiji)
Year of birth missing (living people)